Riverbeds is a Canadian post-rock/emo band from Montreal, Quebec formed in 2010. The band made its recording debut in 2012 with the EP Hiding Small Things In Obvious Places which was released on November 24 at Panda Bar. Riverbeds musical style has been described by Indecent Xposure as being influenced by "Thrice, The Almost and Circa Survive amongst others". The band shared the stage with both local and international bands, including Daylight (now Superheaven), Tyler Daniel Bean and Stuck On Planet Earth.

In March 2014, it was announced that Riverbeds will be playing Pouzza Fest on a bill including The Swellers, The Hotelier and Christie Front Drive. The show took place on May 17, 2014.

The work on their second EP began in 2014 while still playing shows in and around the Montreal area. The album title What You Keep Close was announced in December with a release date of February 5th 2015 for both physical and digital copies.

Following two previous EP, the band decided to write enough material to go on what would be their first full length. CARE was released on June 20th, 2019

Band members
Alexandre Duhamel Gingras –  bass, backing vocals
Charles-André Chamard – drums, lead vocals
Fred Béland – guitar, backing vocals
Vincent Pigeon – lead vocals, guitar

Discography

LP
 CARE (2019)

EP
 Hiding Small Things In Obvious Places (2012)
 What You Keep Close (2015)

Single
 Removing The Head (Or Destroying The Brain)/End Of The World (2011)

References 

Musical groups established in 2010
Experimental musical groups
Canadian indie rock groups
Musical groups from Montreal
English-language musical groups from Quebec
Canadian post-rock groups
2010 establishments in Quebec